The Umatilla Bridge is the collective name for a pair of bridges in the northwest United States, carrying Interstate 82/U.S. Route 395 (I-82/US 395) across the Columbia River at the Washington–Oregon border. The older bridge opened in July 1955 and is a steel through truss cantilever bridge and carries southbound (east on I-82) traffic. Northbound traffic (west on I-82) and pedestrians travel on the newer concrete arch bridge, opened in 1988.

History

Construction 
The old bridge was proposed by Umatilla County judge James H. Sturgis and known as "Sturgis' folly" initially. The construction upstream of McNary Dam would create Lake Wallula and submerge the old Wallula Highway. In the interim, traffic was carried across the newly formed lake via ferry service, with 178,576 vehicles transported in 1951. The bridge was dedicated on July 15, 1955, by the governors of Oregon and Washington. The bridge was financed by $10 million worth of bonds and operated as a toll bridge while under county ownership. The tolls were removed on August 30, 1974, and ownership of the bridge was transferred to the states of Oregon and Washington on November 1 of that year following the repayment of bonds.

The original span was considered for inclusion on the National Register of Historic Places in the early 2000s.

Rehabilitation 

On June 12, 2017, work began on the rehabilitation of the older steel truss bridge. The bridge had been found to be structurally deficient by the Washington State Department of Transportation. Two projects were proposed to repair the bridge. The first project involved repairing the bridge deck which involved shifting traffic off of the 1955 bridge onto the 1988 bridge at a cost of $9.5 million. This project is set to be completed in mid-June 2019 and traffic will once again travel on both of the bridges. The second project involves repainting the steel truss structure at an estimated cost of $40 million.

Description 
It is a five-span continuous Warren through truss design. The configuration of the span is unusual in the fact that it takes advantage of a submerged island near the middle of the Columbia River. With its two  spans, each constructed using the cantilever method, this is the only bridge in Oregon having two spans constructed using that method.

References

External links 

 

Bridges completed in 1955
Bridges completed in 1988
Road bridges in Washington (state)
Bridges over the Columbia River
Bridges in Benton County, Washington
Transportation buildings and structures in Umatilla County, Oregon
Road bridges in Oregon
U.S. Route 395
1955 establishments in Oregon
1955 establishments in Washington (state)
1988 establishments in Oregon
1988 establishments in Washington (state)
Former toll bridges in Oregon
Former toll bridges in Washington (state)
Bridges on the Interstate Highway System
Bridges of the United States Numbered Highway System
Steel bridges in the United States
Concrete bridges in the United States
Cantilever bridges in the United States
Arch bridges in the United States
Warren truss bridges in the United States